Events from the year 1709 in France

Incumbents
 Monarch – Louis XIV

Events
1 January – Battle of St. John's: French capture St. John's, capital of the British colony of Newfoundland.
6 January – Western Europe's Great Frost of 1709, the coldest period in 500 years, begins during the night, lasting three months, with its effects felt for the entire year. In France, the Atlantic coast and Seine River freeze, crops fail, and 24,000 Parisians die. Floating ice enters the North Sea.
13 April – The Raudot Ordinance of 1709 becomes law in the French colony of New France, legalizing slavery.
11 September – Battle of Malplaquet (War of the Spanish Succession) fought near the French border: French strategic victory but tactical victory for the opposing alliance.

Births

7 February – Charles de Brosses, writer (died 1777)
24 February – Jacques de Vaucanson, engineer and inventor (died 1782)
14 April – Charles Collé, dramatist (died 1783)
7 August – Jean-Jacques Lefranc, Marquis de Pompignan, polymath (died 1784)
29 August – Jean-Baptiste-Louis Gresset, poet and dramatist (died 1777)
3 September – Joan Claudi Peiròt, Occitan writer (died 1795)  
23 November – Julien Offray de La Mettrie, physician and philosopher (died 1751)
Full date missing – Jean Girardet, painter of portrait miniatures (died 1778)

Deaths
20 January – François de la Chaise, confessor of Louis XIV (born 1624)
9 February – François Louis, Prince of Conti, general (born 1664)
5 April – Roger de Piles, painter, engraver, art critic and diplomat (born 1635)
17 July – Pascal Collasse, composer (baptized 1649)
4 September – Jean-François Regnard, comic poet (born 1655)
17 October – François Mauriceau, obstetrician (born 1637)
8 December – Thomas Corneille, dramatist (born 1625)
13 December – Louis de Verjus, politician and diplomat (born 1629)
31 December – Pierre Cally, philosopher (born 1630)
Full date missing
Jean-Baptiste Boyer d’Éguilles, engraver, painter and collector (born 1650)
Louise de Prie, royal governess (born 1624)
Thierry Ruinart, monk (born 1657)

See also

References

1700s in France